Hits Unlimited is the fourth album from Dutch/Belgian band 2 Unlimited and the last to feature Ray Slijngaard and Anita Doth. It was a greatest hits package featuring 16 songs: 13 previous singles and 3 new ones. The album was certified gold in the Netherlands. Ray Slijngaard's raps on the verses were not cut on any of the songs on the UK release of this album.

Critical reception
British magazine Music Week wrote, "A storming 16-track collection of pop/rave classics cataloguing the incredible impact Dutch duo Anita and Ray have had since 1991. The inclusion of European versions, with added rap will be a bonus for fans."

Track listing
Do What's Good For Me  – 3:49
No Limit  – 3:30 (From No Limits)
Get Ready for This  – 3:42 (From Get Ready!)
Twilight Zone  – 4:10 (From Get Ready!)
No-One  – 3:26 (From Real Things)
Jump For Joy  – 3:42
Tribal Dance  – 3:40 (From No Limits)
The Magic Friend  – 3:44 (From Get Ready!)
Workaholic  – 3:33 (From Get Ready!)
Let the Beat Control Your Body  – 3:38 (From No Limits)
Nothing Like the Rain  – 3:59 (From Real Things)
Spread Your Love  – 4:43
The Real Thing  – 3:39 (From Real Things)
Here I Go  – 3:16 (From Real Things)
Maximum Overdrive  – 3:41 (From No Limits)
Faces  – 3:32 (From No Limits)

Chart positions
Album

References

2 Unlimited albums
1995 greatest hits albums
Pete Waterman Entertainment albums